Law Hon Pak (14 July 1939 – 7 July 2021) was a Hong Kong boxer. He competed in the men's bantamweight event at the 1964 Summer Olympics. At the 1964 Summer Olympics, he defeated Agustín Senin of Spain, before losing to Juan Fabila Mendoza of Mexico.

References

External links
 

1939 births
2021 deaths
Hong Kong male boxers
Olympic boxers of Hong Kong
Boxers at the 1964 Summer Olympics
Place of birth missing
Bantamweight boxers